is a fictional character from Gege Akutami's manga Jujutsu Kaisen 0. Suguru Geto is a powerful sorcerer who was previously friends with the mentor Satoru Gojo, and wishes to eliminate all non-sorcerers. Launching an attack on jujutsu society, Geto invades the school the Curse of the undead Rika Orimoto chasing the protagonist Yuta Okkotsu. Geto also appears in the main series Jujutsu Kaisen series which, through flashbacks, further explores his friendship with Gojo and what caused his transformation into his enemy. He is voiced by Takahiro Sakurai and Lex Lang.

Akutami created Geto with the idea of prejudice against others. While it is implied that he died at the end of Jujutsu Kaisen 0, his fate was intentionally left ambiguous.

Creation
Gege Akutami was inspired to create Suguru Geto by Shinobu Sensui, an antagonist from Yoshihiro Togashi's manga series YuYu Hakusho. Although Akutami was moved by Sensui's role in the story, he could not feel the same Geto. The idea that conceived this character was that of a man who prejudges others quickly. His name originates from a Japanese snowboarding place known as Geto Kogen Ski Resort. In designing him, Akutami enjoyed drawing his forehead. When writing his backstory, Akutami wanted to empasize how different Geto became after leaving the Jujutsu sorcerer and how he grew to hate common humans. One of Geto's scrolls from the series is a reference to Tite Kubo's manga series Zombiepowder. which he wanted to put in the original series.

Akutami intentionally chose the Satoru Gojo for Geto after researching Buddhist monk's robes and seeing the Gojo-gesa aligned with Gojo's name. He thought it would be fitting and a good way to connect them. Akutami thought it would be nice to show the differences in nuances with their names to match their characters. Satoru as the natural-born genius, and Suguru as the one who achieved genius through hard work and effort. Furthermore, Akutami had Geto dressed as a monk from the prequel as a juxtaposition between his character that was creating this false religious organization while masquerading as a monk, and how monks are regarded in the world, seen as trustworthy in the eyes of the public.

With the eventual reveal that the original Geto dies in Jujutsu Kaisen 0 and the one from the main series is another man possessing his body, Akutami also said that the body memory that activates from one of his arm when Gojo sees him is meant to give a hint that there was still a weak will fighting against Kenjaku. Akutami compared Geto's possession by Kenjaku similar to Orochimaru's body transfer from Masashi Kishimoto's manga series Naruto in order to explain the loss of the original Geto. Akutami also said Geto is a strong villain, believing he could have won his fight against Yuta if he had destroyed the supernatural barrier between Shinjuku and Kyoto. In regards to Geto's strongest technique, Uzumaki, Akutami used Junji Ito's manga series with the same name as the main inspiration. However, he wanted to avoid to referencing it too much to the point it might look more like a copy.

For the Jujutsu Kaisen 0 movie, writer Hiroshi Seko commented that for the movie to fit two hours of length he would need to add new material such as Yuta Okkotsu's past and relationship between Satoru Gojo and Geto. In retrospective, all the action scenes in the second half were exciting for the director, as were the scenes featuring Gojo, Okkotsu, Geto, and Rika. The inclusion of Gojo was to be taken naturally, especially focusing on his relationship with Geto, which is also explored in the television series. However, Park claimed the staff did not want to give such characters too much screen time due to how the narrative primarily focuses on Yuta and Rika. Seko said that the team expanded Yuta and Geto's final fight by adding a scene where the latter throws up blood.

Casting

Takahiro Sakurai plays the role of Geto and was amazed by how cool the protagonists of the movie are. Sakurai read the original Jujutsu Kaisen 0 before recording the movie which surprised him due to a major revelation about Geto. He received lectures by the director during recording of the movie. Among multiple traits from the character, Sakurai was surprised by the friendly relationship between Geto and Gojo. Although it was the first time Geto and Yuta interacted, Sakurai already worked with Ogata multiple times.

Lex Lang enjoyed Geto's characterization as despite he being the antagonist of the movie, he possesses several values which provides his character hidden depths. Lang enjoyed the mix between horror and fights in the series which surprised him in the making of the movie as well as the powers he employs. Lang says that the movie does a good job at exploring Geto especially due to the flashbacks that explore his younger times as a sorcerer with Gojo. However, he refrained from talking more about the character due events that happen to him in the movie's climax.

Appearances
Suguru Geto is a Special Grade Jujutsu Sorcerer and former classmate of Satoru and Shoko, and thus a student of Yaga. His curse technique allows him to absorb and control natural curses and use them for combat. During his time at Tokyo Prefectural Jujutsu High, Geto was an excellent student, as well as considered to be the strongest along with Gojo. After the Star Plasma Vessel mission failed, he developed a strong hatred for people without magical powers to the point of wanting to exterminate them all to give life to a world of sorcerers only, an act that, according to him, it would prevent the creation of cursed spirits and consequently end the cycle in which all sorcerers are trapped. 

In the prequel series, Geto becomes interested by the curse of the young girl Rika Orimoto chasing the sorcerer Yuta who is being trained by Gojo. When Gojo is not present, Geto attacks Yuta and his friends, taking them down easily. However, Yuta reveals his sorcerer power and combines it with Rika now under his control to battle Geto. Overpowered, Geto uses his strongest technique, Uzumaki, but is taken down by Yuta's spell. Losing an arm in combat, Geto escapes from the area and plans a revenge plan to take Rika again. He is then spotted by Satoru Gojo who reminds him of their past but Geto asks him to kill him. 

During the Jujutsu Kaisen series, Kenjaku possesses Geto's identity as he continues his plan of cursing mankind while living with other Cursed beings. Kenjaku surprises Gojo using his temporary shock to imprison him. Although Gojo is trapped by Kenjaku, he manages to make Geto's will recover briefly in the form of his arm strangling Kenjaku for a brief time. Kenjaku keeps using Geto's body in the upcoming story arc alongside his powers.

Reception
Critical response to Geto has been favorable. Polygon liked the character of Suguru Geto, labeling him an entertaining villain who fights the lead Yuta who becomes incredibly energetic in the process. Geto was often compared by several critics with Marvel Comics villain Magneto due to their similar desires for supernatural individuals to rule. IGN instead compared him to Gellert Grindelwald from the Harry Potter due to how their beliefs involve the improvement of mankind which are questionably immoral in contrast to more kind character's method of thinking like Gojo or Okkotsu. This is explored in the movie where Geto explains that he does not care about humans who lack powers in his need to create his own utopia. The Fandom Post enjoyed Geto's story in the movie and looked forward to see his relationship with Geto. However, his own role as the villain was not seen as striking when compared with other other famous series. Manga News looked forward to more focus about the relationship between Gojo and Geto. The Fandom Post acclaimed the English voice acting of Lex Lang as the best one in the movie.

Polygon praised MAPPA's most fight appealing ones scenes, mainly Yuta and Suguru Geto, to the point they are superior to most of their past works such as The God of High School. Comic Book Resources enjoyed the handling of Yuta's curse and his relationship with the antagonistic Geto. While finding the fight between Okkotsu and Geto enjoyable, Yahoo believes that former and Inumaki's fight against a Curse in the film was better executed. Comic Book Resources noted the that while the film several changes, the inclusion of the first anime series characters but only as cameos. Meanwhile, Gojo's relationship with Geto was edited too in the final scene when compared to the manga which makes the former less emotive and tragic than in the original manga. In another article, the same site considered Geto and Itadori as parallels of the hero archetype based on why they become sorcerers to help others but often faced failures. However, the two characters were noted to have had different reactions to their failures which led them to take different paths with Itadori's friendship with Megumi Fushiguro giving him a more positive road in contrast to the loner Geto.

In the climax of the movie, Yuta manages to overpower Geto who escapes after suffering severe wounds. As he tries to leave, Gojo appears and kills him. This scene confused the viewers of the movie due to Geto still appearing in the television series set a year after the movie. The nature of Suguru Geto's survival is not explained either in the first season of the anime and, instead, writers claimed that fans have to read the main series as the manga explains properly the nature of Suguru Geto once Gojo meets him again. With the eventual reveal that the Suguru Geto from the main series was Kenjaku, Comic Book Resources wrote that there was a chance of Geto somehow retaining his memories in a clash against his parasite when Gojo confronts him in the main series forcing Geto's arm to attack Kenjaku. Real Sound praised the complex story involving Geto and Gojo as well the plot twist that former was already dead in his introduction and instead was being used by Kenjaku. Manga News was negative to this twist as it ruins Geto's character due to previous focus of his backstory in previous volumes to be replaced by Kenjaku. However, another writer from the same site felt the twist was effective as it comes with a way to defeat Gojo since he was one of the most powerful characters in the story.

In promoting Jujutsu Kaisen 0, Uniqlo produced a series of shirts that have Geto's image. In a popularity poll from the series made in 2021, Geto took the 12th place. For the second poll, Geto's popularity rose, taking 4th place. Akutami also commented on Geto's popularity during a Valentine's Day where the author noted that it might be related to the release of the Jujutsu Kaisen 0 movie.

References

Anime and manga supervillains
Comics characters introduced in 2017
Fictional characters with energy-manipulation abilities
Male characters in anime and manga
Martial artist characters in anime and manga
Villains in animated television series